Elections in Haryana, which is a state in India, have been conducted since 1967 to elect the members of state-level Haryana Legislative Assembly and national-level Lok Sabha. There are 90 assembly constituencies (17 reserved for SC) and 10 Lok Sabha constituencies (2 reserved for SC).

History

Before formation of Haryana

Prior to Haryana's establishment as a separate state in 1966, after carving out Haryana from Punjab, elections in Haryana were part of elections in unified Punjab. Cis-Sutlej states, which included princely states of Jind, Kaithal and Kalsia, as well as the parts of pricnely states of Patiala and Nabha falling in Haryana, were merged with the PEPSU Legislative Assembly (existed 1948 - 1956). On 1 November 1956, PEPSU was merged mostly into Punjab State  following the States Reorganisation Act. Part of former state of PEPSU lie within the present state of Haryana which was separated from Punjab on 1 November 1966, those parts include the area around Jind and the Narnaul enclave. Until 1967 elections in Haryana were part of the Elections in Punjab.

After formation of Haryana
Haryana was carved out of the former state of East Punjab on 1 November 1966 on linguistic as well as on cultural basis. Since 1967 elections have been held by the Election Commission of Haryana. 1st (1951), 2nd (1957) and 3rd (1962) Lok Sabha elections (also called general elections) were held when Haryana was still part of Punjab. Haryana was divided into 10 Lok Sabha constituencies, out of which 2 are reserved. After the electoral boundaries delimitation in 2007 by the Delimitation Commission of India, Bhiwani and  Mahendragarh
constituencies became defunctional and those were replaces by 2 new reorganised constituencies.

Delimitation
After formation of Haryana in 1966, the composition of Lok Sabha was changed and seats were enhanced to accommodate additional seats from the newly formed state of Haryana. Last delimitation of electoral boundaries of Lok Sabha and Vidhan Sabha constituencies in Haryana was done by the Delimitation Commission of India in 2007-08. After the delimitation in 2007-08, Bhiwani and  Mahendragarh constituencies were merged to form Bhiwani–Mahendragarh and a new Gurgaon Lok Sabha constituency was craved out by bifurcating the existing Faridabad Lok Sabha Constituency.

Currently Haryana has 10 Lok Sabha and 90 Vidhan Sabha seats, of which 2 Lok Sabha and 17 Vidhan Sabha seats are reserved for the Scheduled Castes. For the 2026 delimitation, Haryana is proposed to have 14 Lok Sabha and 126 Vidhan Sabha seats, of which 3 Lok Sabha (1 more) and 25 Vidhan Sabha (8 more) seats will be reserved. This will added 4 Lok Sabha and 36 Vidhan Sabha seats to Haryana.

Major Political Parties
In politics of Haryana, the Indian National Congress (INC), Bharatiya Janata Party (BJP), Indian National Lok Dal (INLD), Jannayak Janta Party (JJP) and Sarvhit Party (SHP) are the major political parties in the state. In the past, various parties such as Haryana Vikas Party (HVP), Haryana Janhit Congress (BL) (HJC-BL), Janata Dal (JD), Janata Party (JP), Vishal Haryana Party (VHP), Bharatiya Jana Sangh (BJS) among others have been influential in the state.

The dynastic political clans of Haryana are often criticised for the infamous self-serving politics of the Aaya Ram Gaya Ram turncoats who notoriously engage in the frequent party switching, political horse trading, unholy political alliances, political corruption, political cronyism, nepotistic-dynastic rule which serves their own clan more than it serves their voters and people of Haryana they are ought to serve.

Conducting elections

Elections in Haryana are conducted by the Election Commission of Haryana (ECH), which operates under the Election Commission of India (ECI. Administration of ECH at state level is under the "Chief Electoral Officer of Haryana", who is an IAS officer of Principal Secretary rank. At the district and constituency levels, the District Magistrates (in their capacity as District Election Officers), Electoral Registration Officers and Returning Officers perform election work. Election Commission of India is an autonomous constitutional authority responsible for administering election processes in India at national, state and district level. The body administers elections to the Lok Sabha, Rajya Sabha, state Legislative Assemblies, state legislative Councils, and the offices of the President and Vice President of the country. The Election Commission operates under the authority of Constitution per Article 324, and subsequently enacted Representation of the People Act.

Type of elections
Haryana, after being separated from Punjab, first went to polls in 1967. Lok Sabha elections, also called the General Elections, are held at national level, Vidhan Sabha elections are held to elect the state level assembly, and the grassroots local self-governance elections are held at Municipal and Gram panchayat (village council) level.

Lok Sabha elections

Haryana has 10 Lok Sabha constituencies, including 2 reserved constituencies (Ambala and Sirsa).

 Current constituency

 Ambala 
 Bhiwani–Mahendragarh
 Faridabad  
 Gurgaon
 Hisar
 Karnal
 Kurukshetra
 Rohtak
 Sirsa
 Sonipat

 Defunct constituency

 Bhiwani
 Mahendragarh

 List of Lok Sabha elections in Haryana.

Vidhan Sabha Elections 
The elections for the Haryana Vidhan Sabha are being held since 1967.

Local elections

Local self-government in India refers to governmental jurisdictions below the level of the state in the federal republic of India with three spheres of government: central (union), state and local. The 73rd and 74th constitutional amendments give recognition and protection to local governments and in addition each state has its own local government legislation. Since 1993, local government in India takes place in two very distinct forms.  Urban localities, covered in the 74th amendment to the Constitution, have Nagar Palika but derive their powers from the individual state governments, while the powers of rural localities have been formalized under the panchayati raj system, under the 73rd amendment to the Constitution. District Magistrates (in their capacity as District Election Officers), Electoral Registration Officers and Returning Officers are responsible for conducting municipal and panchayat raj  elections at village, block and district level.

Haryana has 22 districts, 72 sub-divisions, 93 tehsils, 50 sub-tehsils, 142 blocks, 154 cities and towns, 6,841 villages, 6212 villages panchayats and numerous smaller dhanis. Haryana has at least 10 municipal corporations (Gurugram, Faridabad, Ambala, Panchkula, Yamunanagar, Rohtak, Hisar, Panipat, Karnal and Sonepat),  18 municipal councils and 52 municipalities (c. Jan 2018). See the partial list (please help expand) of 
and 
.

Electoral demography

Voters

According to Election Commission of Haryana, Haryana had a population of 2,1145,000 and 25,352,000 in 2001 and 2011 respectively. In October 2019, Haryana had 1,82,98,714 voters, including 1,81,91,228 general voters and 1,07,486 Service Voters (postal voters), who will cast votes 19,425 polling stations for the 2019 Haryana Legislative Assembly election. Psephologists, electoral data scientists, political analysts, Political forecasters, opinion polls and media often analyse and discuss the electoral demography in terms of gender, age group, castes, electoral geography, ethnic enclaves, swing of voters from/to a particular party or candidate.

According to 2011 Census of India, there are 87.46% Hindus, 7.03% Muslims (mainly Meos), and 4.91% Sikhs. In terms of native language, 87.31% use Hindi, 10.57% Punjabi, and 1.23% Urdu. Haryana has 70% rural population who primarily speak Haryanvi dialect of Hindi, and related dialects, such as Bagri and Mewati.

Psephological regions

Haryana was made a separate state on linguistic and cultural basis. Consequently, within the limited context of elections the psephologists often refer to various geo-ethnic enclaves and geo-linguistic areas of Haryana, which are the Ahirwal, Deshwal belt, GT Road belt, Jat belt, Mewat, Punjabi belt, and Ror belt. Description of these psephological regions is as follows: 

 Ahirwal region in South Haryana, centered around Rewari and numerically dominated by the Ahir community, has 11 assembly segments spread over three Lok Sabha seats — Bhiwani-Mahendergarh (Mahendergarh district only), Gurgaon and Rohtak [Kosli assembly constituency only].

 Jat belt is an area where jats are found in numerically higher numbers compared to other castes. 
 Bagar tract: Western haryana 
 Bangar tract: Central Haryana 
 Deshwali belt:

 GT Road belt, an area on either side of the Grand Trunk Road from Ambala to Sonepat, has 28 legislative assembly constituencies. This area is not dominated there is no dominance of one caste or community in the northern districts of Panchkula, Ambala, Yamunanagar, Kurukshetra, Panipat and Kaithal.
 Punjabi belt: There is no dominant caste in the northern area of GT Road belt, which is also inhabited by the people who migrated from Pakistan after the partition of India. Among these migrants, Punjabis have sizable population in the urban areas (cities and towns) of northern GT Road.
 Nardak / Ror belt 

 Mewat region spread across Nuh district and Hathin tehsil of Palwal district in South Haryana is numerically dominated by the Meo community who speak Mewati dialect in rural areas.

Electoral female disempowerment

According to ECH data Haryana has poor female participation in contesting elections, out of the 90 assembly seats there are 58 seats which have never elected a female MLA. The Kalanaur Vidhan Sabha reserved constituency has elected the most number of female MLAs. From 1967 to 2014, 44 elected female MLAs were from congress, 11 from BJP, 6 from Janata Dal and INLD, 4 from Janata Party, 2 from Vishal Haryana Party, 2 from Hariyana Vikas Party. As of September 2019, only 3 female have won elections an independent candidate: Sharada Rani from Ballabgarh in 1982, Meritorious from Jhajjar in 1987 and Shakuntala Bhagwadia from Bawal in 2005. In 2014, 10 candidates were fielded by Congress, 16 by INlD, 15 by BJP, 12 by Haryana lokhit Party, 5 of HJC, 6 by Bahujan Samaj Party, and 4 by Jan Chetna Party, among them Rohita Rewari of BJP from Panipat city garnered a maximum of 63.5% votes, and a minimum of 30.3% votes were gained by Santosh Chauhan Sarwan of BJP from Mullana. In 2019 Vidhan Sabha elections, only 9 (10% of total legislature membership) female candidate were elected, 4 from Congress, 3 from BJP, 1 from JJP and 1 independent.Only 9 women make it to Haryana assembly, 23 in Maharashtra, Economic Times, 25 October 2019.</ref>

Prominent female politicians of Haryana include the late Sushma Swaraj - former Union Foreign Minister, and Chandravati - former Governor who had defeated then Chief Minister Bansi Lal in 1972.

 Female contestants in Vidhan Sabha elections

See also
 PEPSU Legislative Assembly 
 Elections in Punjab, India, Haryana was carved out of Punjab in 1966
 Elections in Himachal Pradesh, Himachal was carved out of Punjab in 1966
 Elections in India, national elections
 History of democracy in the Indian-subcontinent
 Divisions of Haryana

References

External links 
 Chief Electoral Officer - official website, contains electoral rolls.
 Geo-ethnic cultural electoral regions of Haryana, Times of India report.
 Eco-Cultural regions of Haryana, from M.R. Madhava Menon's book "Criminal Justice India Series: Haryana" published by the West Bengal National University of Juridical Sciences, page 6.

 
Haryana-related lists